Hungary competed at the 1952 Summer Olympics in Helsinki, Finland. 189 competitors, 162 men and 27 women, took part in 107 events in 15 sports.

Medalists

Hungary finished in third position in the final medal rankings, behind only the United States and Soviet Union.

|  style="text-align:left; width:78%; vertical-align:top;"|

Default sort order: Medal, Date, Name

| style="text-align:left; width:22%; vertical-align:top;"|

Multiple medalists
The following competitors won multiple medals at the 1952 Olympic Games.

Athletics

Basketball

Men's Team Competition
Qualification Round (Group B)
 Defeated Greece (75-38)
 Lost to Philippines (35-48)
 Defeated Greece (47-44)
Main Round (Group A)
 Lost to United States (48-66)
 Lost to Uruguay (56-70)
 Lost to Czechoslovakia (39-63) → did not advance, 15th place
Team Roster
László Bánhegyi
Pál Bogár
György Bokor 
Tibor Cselkó 
Tibor Czinkán 
János Greminger 
László Hódy
Tibor Mezőfi
Péter Papp 
János Simon 
Gyula Telegdy
Tibor Zsíros

Boxing

Men's Flyweight:
 Kornél Molnár 
 First Round – Lost to William Michael Toweel of South Africa (0 - 3)

Men's Featherweight:
 János Erdei
 First Round – Defeated Georges Malézanoff of Bulgaria (2 - 1)
 Second Round – Defeated Kurt Schirra of Saarland (3 - 0)
 Third Round – Lost to Jan Zachara of Czechoslovakia (1 - 2)

Men's Lightweight:
 István Juhász
 First Round – Defeated Luis Albino Acuña of Uruguay (3 - 0)
 Second Round – Defeated  Clayton Orten Kenny of Canada (2 - 1)
 Third Round – Lost to Aureliano Bolognesi of Italy (1 - 2)

Light-welterweight
 Béla Farkas
 First Round – Lost to Pavle Šovljanski of Yugoslavia (0 - 3)

Men's Welterweight:
 Pál Budai
 First Round – Lost to Günther Heidemann of Germany (1 - 2)

Men's Light-Middleweight:
 László Papp →  Gold Medal
 First Round – Defeated Ellsworth Webb of United States (KO 2R)
 Second Round – Defeated Charles Chase of Canada (KO 2R)
 Third Round – Defeated Petar Stankoff Spassoff of Bulgaria (3 - 0)
 Semifinal – Defeated Eladio Oscar Herrera of Argentina (3 - 0)
 Final – Defeated Theunis Jacobus van Schalkwyk of South Africa (3 - 0)

Men's Middleweight:
 Mátyás Plachy
 First Round – Lost to Nelson de Paula Andrade of Brazil (1 - 2)

Men's Light-heavyweight
 István Fazekas
 First Round – Lost to Toon Pastor of Netherlands (0 - 3)

Men's Heavyweight:
 László Bene
 Second Round – Lost to Ilkka Koski of Finland (KO 2R)

Canoeing

Cycling

Road Competition
Men's Individual Road Race (190.4 km)
István Lang — did not finish (→ no ranking)
István Schillerwein — did not finish (→ no ranking)
Lajos Látó — did not finish (→ no ranking)

Track Competition
Men's 1.000m Time Trial
István Lang
 Final — 1:16.9 (→ 18th place)

Men's 1.000m Sprint Scratch Race
Béla Szekeres — 6th place

Fencing

17 fencers, 14 men and 3 women, represented Hungary in 1952.

Men's foil
 Endre Tilli
 Lajos Maszlay
 Endre Palócz

Men's team foil
 Endre Tilli, Aladár Gerevich, Endre Palócz, Lajos Maszlay, Tibor Berczelly, József Sákovics

Men's épée
 József Sákovics
 Barnabás Berzsenyi
 Béla Rerrich

Men's team épée
 Lajos Balthazár, Barnabás Berzsenyi, Béla Rerrich, József Sákovics, Imre Hennyei

Men's sabre
 Pál Kovács
 Aladár Gerevich
 Tibor Berczelly

Men's team sabre
 Aladár Gerevich, Tibor Berczelly, Rudolf Kárpáti, Pál Kovács, László Rajcsányi, Bertalan Papp

Women's foil
 Ilona Schachererné Elek
 Magdolna Nyári-Kovács
 Margit Elek

Football

Gymnastics

Modern pentathlon

Three male pentathletes represented Hungary in 1952. They won gold in the team event with Gábor Benedek winning silver and István Szondy winning bronze in the individual event.

Individual
 Gábor Benedek
 István Szondy
 Aladár Kovácsi

Team
 Gábor Benedek
 István Szondy
 Aladár Kovácsi

Rowing

Hungary had 15 male rowers participate in three out of seven rowing events in 1952.

 Men's coxed pair
 László Halász
 József Sátori
 Róbert Zimonyi (cox)

 Men's coxless four
 László Decker
 Imre Kaffka
 János Hollósi
 Imre Kemény

 Men's eight
 István Sándor
 Csaba Kovács
 Miklós Zágon
 Tibor Nádas
 Rezső Riheczky
 Pál Bakos
 László Marton
 Béla Zsitnik
 Róbert Zimonyi (cox)

Shooting

Six shooters represented Hungary in 1952. In the 25 m pistol event Károly Takács won gold and Szilárd Kun won silver. Ambrus Balogh won bronze in the 50 m pistol.

25 m pistol
 Károly Takács
 Szilárd Kun

50 m pistol
 Ambrus Balogh
 Ferenc Décsey

300 m rifle, three positions
 Ambrus Balogh
 Ferenc Décsey

50 m rifle, three positions
 Imre Ágoston
 János Dosztály

50 m rifle, prone
 Imre Ágoston
 János Dosztály

Swimming

Water polo

Weightlifting

Wrestling

References

Nations at the 1952 Summer Olympics
1952
1952 in Hungarian sport